Hans Krüger may refer to:
 Hans Krüger (pharmacist) (1898–1988), anthroposophist, pharmacist and researcher
 Hans Krüger (1902–1971), German Nazi politician, co-founder of Federation of Expellees
 Hans Krueger or Krüger (1909–1988), SS functionary responsible for the Czarny Las Massacre